Tân Phong is a township and capital of Quảng Xương District, Thanh Hóa Province.

References

Communes of Thanh Hóa province
Populated places in Thanh Hóa province
District capitals in Vietnam
Townships in Vietnam